Mario Ančić was the defending champion, but lost in the second round to Mikhail Youzhny.

Andy Murray won in the final 6–2, 6–3, against Fernando Verdasco.

Seeds

Draw

Finals

Top half

Bottom half

External links
Draw
Qualifying draw

2007 Singles
2007 ATP Tour
2007 in Russian tennis